Karibib Air Force Base  is an air base near the central Namibian town of Karibib. Since 2016, the headquarters of the Namibian Air Force are located here. Air Force Command had previously been at the Grootfontein Air Force Base.

See also

List of airports in Namibia
Transport in Namibia

References

External links
 OurAirport - Namibia

Airports in Namibia
Military of Namibia